The 2020–21 season was the 111th season in the existence of Real Sociedad and the club's 11th consecutive season in the top flight of Spanish football. In addition to the domestic league, Real Sociedad participated in this season's editions of the Copa del Rey, the Supercopa de España, and also participated in the UEFA Europa League. The season covered the period from 20 July 2020 to 30 June 2021, with the late start to the season due to the COVID-19 pandemic in Spain.

Players

First-team squad

Reserve team

Out on loan

Transfers

In

Out

Pre-season and friendlies

Competitions

Overview

La Liga

League table

Results summary

Results by round

Matches
The league fixtures were announced on 31 August 2020.

Copa del Rey

Supercopa de España

The draw was held on 17 December 2020.

UEFA Europa League

Group stage

The group stage draw was held on 2 October 2020.

Knockout phase

Round of 32
The draw for the round of 32 was held on 14 December 2020.

Statistics

Squad statistics
Last updated on 22 May 2021. Does not include the 2020 Copa del Rey Final, delayed until April 2021 and counted in the 2020–21 season in some resources – these stats are recorded under the 2019–20 Real Sociedad season article.

|-
! colspan="14" style="background:#dcdcdc; text-align:center"|Goalkeepers

|-
! colspan="14" style="background:#dcdcdc; text-align:center"|Defenders

|-
! colspan="14" style="background:#dcdcdc; text-align:center"|Midfielders

|-
! colspan="14" style="background:#dcdcdc; text-align:center"|Forwards

|-
! colspan=14 style=background:#dcdcdc; text-align:center|Players who have made an appearance this season but have left the club

|}

Goalscorers

Notes

References

External links

Real Sociedad seasons
Real Sociedad
Real Sociedad